777 is the first DVD by American rock band Underoath. It was released in the United States and other countries on July 17, 2007, with the intention of having the numbers of its release date coincide with the DVD title.

The DVD is split into three sections: "Moments Suspended in Time"; the "MySpace Secret Show", which was played in St. Petersburg, Florida; and a music video section. The three music videos included are the final products of Underoath's video shoot in Skellefteå, Sweden with Popcore Films. The making of the music video for "You're Ever So Inviting" is exclusively recorded on the DVD as well.

DVD track listing

Moments Suspended in Time
 06.20.06 – Hot Topic signing at Countryside Mall – MySpace secret show "Behind the Scenes" footage
 04.28.06 – European Tour
 10.30.06 – Paris, France
 10.08.06 – New Zealand & Australia
 04.22.06 – London
 10.21.06 – Japan
 05.31.06 – MTV, NYC
 05.07.06 – Bamboozle
 05.04.06 – US Tour with Poison the Well & As Cities Burn
 07.07.06 – Somewhere in Canada
 05.06.06 – Allentown, PA
 01.30.07 – Sweden
 06.20.06 – One More Song

MySpace Secret Show (6/20/06)
 "I Don't Feel Very Receptive Today"
 "It's Dangerous Business Walking Out Your Front Door"
 "Writing on the Walls"
 "The Impact of Reason"
 "In Regards to Myself"
 "Everyone Looks So Good from Here"
 "A Boy Brushed Red Living in Black and White"

Music Videos
 "Writing on the Walls"
 "In Regards to Myself"
 "You're Ever So Inviting"

Awards

In 2008, the album received was nominations for a Dove Award for Long Form Music Video of the Year at the 39th GMA Dove Awards.

References

Underoath albums
2007 live albums
2007 video albums
Live video albums